Brisbane North was an electoral district which elected two members to the Legislative Assembly of Queensland in the Australian state of Queensland from 1888 until 1912. It replaced the electoral district of North Brisbane.

Following the Electoral Districts Act 1910, which attempted to apply one vote one value to Queensland electorates, Brisbane North was split into the seats of Brisbane and Paddington.

Members for Brisbane North 
The members for Brisbane North were:

See also
 Electoral districts of Queensland
 Members of the Queensland Legislative Assembly by year
 :Category:Members of the Queensland Legislative Assembly by name

References

Former electoral districts of Queensland
1888 establishments in Australia
1912 disestablishments in Australia
Constituencies established in 1888
Constituencies disestablished in 1912